Rachel Komisarz (born December 5, 1976), also known by her married name Rachel Komisarz-Baugh, is an American former competition swimmer, Olympic gold medalist, and former world record-holder. She began swimming when she was a senior at Warren Mott high school because of a gymnastics injury that left her with two fractured vertebrae. Komisarz swam at the University of Kentucky and became a seven-time All American swimmer and three-time SEC Champion by the end of her four years at the university. Not only was Komisarz very dedicated to swimming while at the University of Kentucky, she graduated with a Bachelor of Arts in Education and a Kinesiology major with an emphasis in exercise.

She swam for the United States team at the 2004 Summer Olympics, where she won a gold medal in the women's 4×200-meter freestyle relay, and a silver medal in the women's 4×100-meter medley relay, after swimming in the preliminary session of the meet. Komisarz did not make the 2008 Olympic team, and had shoulder surgery shortly after. Once she had recovered, she tried to get back into the pool, but it just was not the same anymore. It was in 2009 that she stopped competitively swimming.

Komisarz was named an assistant swim coach at the University of Louisville in 2009, where she help build the men's and women's team to 5 conference championships. She was also the women's recruiting coordinator and helped bring in the top athletes in the world, ranking the recruiting classes 12th and 7th in the NCAA for the 2010 and 2011 respectively. While she was an assistant at the University of Louisville, she helped bring the women's team to place 15th, and the men's team to place 10th at the NCAA Championships.  During her coaching years at the University of Louisville, Komisarz also earned a master's degree in Sports Administration.

Komisarz was named the head coach of the Ohio Bobcats women's swimming team at Ohio University in 2014, after serving five years as an assistant coach for the Louisville Cardinals swimming team at the University of Louisville.  Since taking the job at Ohio University, Komisarz's teams have finished 6th twice at the conference championships.  The Bobcats improved one spot to 5th in the 2017 conference championships.  Komisarz currently has a meet record of 18–15, and has helped 3 swimmers qualify for the Olympic Trials.

On June 21, 2018, Komisarz and Conrad Dobler were enshrined into the National Polish-American Sports Hall of Fame in Troy, Michigan.

See also
 List of Olympic medalists in swimming (women)
 List of World Aquatics Championships medalists in swimming (women)
 World record progression 4 × 100 metres medley relay

References

External links
 
 
 
 BEST sports Profile

1976 births
Living people
American female butterfly swimmers
American female freestyle swimmers
World record setters in swimming
Kentucky Wildcats women's swimmers
Medalists at the 2004 Summer Olympics
Medalists at the FINA World Swimming Championships (25 m)
Olympic gold medalists for the United States in swimming
Olympic silver medalists for the United States in swimming
World Aquatics Championships medalists in swimming
Universiade medalists in swimming
Sportspeople from Warren, Michigan
Louisville Cardinals swimming coaches
Ohio Bobcats swimming coaches
Universiade silver medalists for the United States
Swimmers at the 2004 Summer Olympics
Medalists at the 2001 Summer Universiade
American people of Polish descent